The Sen. William Blair House is located in Waukesha, Wisconsin, United States, and was listed on the National Register of Historic Places in 1983.

It was built for State Senator William Blair (1820-1880), who was a prominent businessman and politician.  The house's historical significance derives from its association with Blair, as well as its contribution as an example of Italianate architecture in Waukesha.  The exterior of the house is still an example of its style, though an addition was added in 1997, as well as window replacements and other minor changes.  The interior has been significantly modified and is not considered historically significant.

The house has had several uses over the years, including a stint as a medical clinic.

References

Houses in Waukesha County, Wisconsin
Houses on the National Register of Historic Places in Wisconsin
Italianate architecture in Wisconsin
National Register of Historic Places in Waukesha County, Wisconsin
Houses completed in 1877
Buildings and structures in Waukesha, Wisconsin
1877 establishments in Wisconsin